Donald S. Rimai is an American engineer.

Rimai worked for Kodak for 34 years. In 1999, he was elected a fellow of the American Physical Society "[f]or his contributions in the fields of particle adhesion and electrophotography."

References

Kodak people
20th-century American engineers
Living people
Year of birth missing (living people)
Fellows of the American Physical Society
21st-century American engineers